The Royal Commission for the Investigation of all Grievances Affecting His Majesty's Subjects of Lower Canada was established 7 years after the publication of the report of a Select Committee of the House of Commons on the Civil Government of Canada, which had recommended important constitutional changes that were never effected.

Governor Gosford lead the royal commission of inquiry as commissioner together with Charles Edward Grey and George Gipps. They received instructions from Charles Grant, 1st Baron Glenelg, Secretary of State for War and the Colonies.

Report 

Five reports, in addition to a conclusive general report were prepared by the commission.

The commissioners published a first report on financial matters in January 1836. Drafted by Gipps, the report recommended all crown revenues to be surrendered to the Legislative Assembly with the exception of a modest civil list. A second report was published in March. It recommended the Revenue Act of 1831 to be repealed to place at the disposal of the Executive sufficient funds to carry on the essential services of government. In May, a third report rejected the constitutional change whereby the Executive Council members would be responsible before the elective House of Assembly.

A final report was published on 17 November 1836. Was rejected the idea of modifying the electoral system to increase the representation of British settlers in the colony.

The commission's work became the basis of the ten resolutions which John Russell, then Whig Secretary of State for the Home Department, submitted to the House of Commons on 6 March 1837.

Notes

References 

 Reports of Commissioners on Grievances Complained of in Lower Canada. Ordered by the House of Commons to be printed, 20 February 1837, in Parliamentary Papers, 1837, XXIV, 3-416. (online)
 Russell, John. Resolutions intended to be proposed by Lord John Russell, in a committee of the whole house, relative to the affairs of Canada, March 1837 (online)
 Mill, John Stuart. "Radical Party and Canada: Lord Durham and the Canadians", in London and Westminster Review, VI & XXVIII, 502-33, January 1838 (online)

See also 

 Lower Canada Rebellion
 Constitutional history of Canada

Political history of Quebec
Royal commissions in Canada
19th century in the United Kingdom